This list contains articles about political officeholders outside of Pakistan, who are of Pakistani origin.

Australia
 Mehreen Faruqi, member of the Australian Senate for Greens, and former MP in the New South Wales Legislative Council.

Canada

 Salma Ataullahjan, member of the Canadian Senate for the Conservative Party.

Denmark
 Nadeem Farooq, member of the Folketing for the Danish Social Liberal Party.
 Kamal Qureshi, member of the Folketing for the Socialist People's Party.
 Abbas Razvi, member of the Folketing for the Danish Social Liberal Party.
 Sikandar Siddique, member of the Folketing for The Alternative.

Indonesia
 Nur Indah Cintra Sukma Munsyi, member of the Regional Representative Council from East Java.

Malaysia
 Musa Aman, Chief Minister of Sabah and member of UMNO.
 Yamani Hafez Musa, member of the Malaysian Parliament and Deputy Minister of Finance.
 Harris Salleh, Chief Minister of Sabah and member of BERJAYA.

Mozambique
 Abdul Magid Osman, Minister of Economy and Finance of Mozambique (1986–1991) and a member of FRELIMO.

Netherlands
 Fahid Minhas, member of the House of Representatives for the People's Party for Freedom and Democracy.
 Mariëlle Paul, member of the House of Representatives for the People's Party for Freedom and Democracy.

New Zealand
 Ashraf Choudhary, member of the New Zealand Parliament for the Labour Party.

Norway
 Akhtar Chaudhry, former member and Fourth Vice President of the Storting for the Socialist Left Party.
 Lubna Jaffery, member of the Storting for the Labour Party.
 Mudassar Kapur, member of the Storting for the Conservative Party.
 Afshan Rafiq, member of the Storting for the Conservative Party.
 Abid Raja, member and former Fifth Vice President of the Storting for the Liberal Party, and Minister of Culture (2020–21).
 Hadia Tajik, member of the Storting for the Labour Party, Minister of Culture (2012–13), and Minister of Labour and Social Inclusion (2021–22).
 Shahbaz Tariq, member of the Storting for the Labour Party.

Singapore
 Raeesah Khan, member of the Parliament of Singapore for the Workers' Party.

Thailand
 Swab Phaoprathan, member of the House of Representatives for the Bhumjaithai Party.
 Chada Thaiseth, member of the Thai parliament.
 Mananya Thaiseth, Deputy Agriculture Minister of Thailand.

United Kingdom

 Sajid Javid, member of the Conservative Party.
 Sadiq Khan, member of the British parliament for the Labour Party and incumbent Mayor of London.

United States

 Saqib Ali, member of the Maryland House of Delegates for the Democratic Party.

References

Lists of politicians